Vigala is an -long river in Rapla County, Estonia. It is a tributary of the river Kasari. Its source is on the Keava bog. The basin area of Vigala is 1,577 km2.

Biggest tributary rivers of Vigala are Velise and Rõue on the left and Kodila on the right side.

Konuvere stone bridge over the Vigala river was the longest stone bridge in Estonia (110 m) when it was opened in 1861.

In the Vigala river, there occurs a rare natural phenomena – Ice Circle of Vana-Vigala.

Gallery

References

External links

Rivers of Estonia
Landforms of Rapla County